The 6th TVyNovelas Awards, is an Academy of special awards to the best of soap operas and TV shows. The awards ceremony took place on April 18, 1988 in the Centro libanes, México D.F. The ceremony was televised in the Mexico by Canal de las estrellas.

Claudia Córdova and Raúl Velasco hosted the show. Quinceañera won 8 awards including Best Telenovela of the Year, the most for the evening. Other winners Senda de gloria won 4 awards, Rosa salvaje won 2 awards and Victoria, and Tal como somos won one each.

Summary of awards and nominations

Winners and nominees

Novelas

Others

Special Awards
Musical Career: Lola Beltrán
Journalistic Career: Leopoldo Murras
Special recognition to the pioneers of telenovelas: Jesús Gómez Obregón, Fernanda Villeli and  Silvia Derbez
No.1 Singer of Tropical Music: Celia Cruz
Launching Musical: Sasha
Best Group Musician-Vocal: Timbiriche
Show Most Successful Night Club in 1987: Polo Polo
International Revelation: Karina

References 

TVyNovelas Awards
TVyNovelas Awards
TVyNovelas Awards
TVyNovelas Awards ceremonies